Anthony Mandrea (born 25 December 1996) is an Algerian professional footballer who plays as a goalkeeper for Ligue 2 club Caen and the Algeria national football team.

Club career
Mandrea made his Ligue 1 debut for Nice on 3 November 2013 in a 1–2 home defeat against Bordeaux, replacing an injured David Ospina after 51 minutes. At 16 years and 10 months he was, at the time, the youngest goalkeeper to play in Ligue 1. He made no further first team appearances for Nice, and in the summer of 2016 he moved to Angers, where he signed professional terms on a three-year deal in September 2017. His Angers debut came in the Coupe de la Ligue on 12 December 2017 against Metz, in which he kept a clean sheet.

In July 2020, as third-choice goalkeeper for Angers, he was loaned to SO Cholet in the Championnat National in search of playing time. At the end of the season he was named best goalkeeper of the Championnat National season.

On 23 June 2022, Mandrea moved to Caen on a two-year deal.

Personal life
Mandrea was born in France to a French father and Algerian mother. He made one appearance for the France U18s at the Tournoi de Limoges in 2013. He was called up to the senior Algeria national team in May 2022.
He debutes his national career with Algeria in a friendly match against Iran which ended in a 2-1 win to Algeria in June 12th, 2022.

References

External links
 
 
 

Living people
1996 births
Association football goalkeepers
French footballers
France youth international footballers
French sportspeople of Algerian descent
Ligue 1 players
Ligue 2 players
Championnat National players
Championnat National 2 players
Championnat National 3 players
OGC Nice players
Angers SCO players
SO Cholet players
Stade Malherbe Caen players
People from Grasse
Sportspeople from Alpes-Maritimes
Footballers from Provence-Alpes-Côte d'Azur
Algerian footballers
Algeria international footballers